Judge Dredd: The Mega Collection is a fortnightly partwork collection of hardback books published by Hachette Partworks. The series is made up of 90 volumes which contain thematic collections of stories about 2000 AD’s Judge Dredd and related characters, as well as bonus material including previously unpublished art. The spine art on the books combine to display a new image by artist Patrick Goddard. The series was also accompanied by the launch of a series of podcasts called '2000 AD Thrill-Casts' which, after the 6th episode, widened its focus to 2000 AD in general. On 5 July 2017 it was officially announced that the series had been extended from 80 to 90 issues.

The series is the third recent comics series by Hachette Partworks. It follows the success of The Official Marvel Graphic Novel Collection and Marvel's Mightiest Heroes Graphic Novel Collection and is the first which departs from Marvel comics. It is available in the UK, Ireland and Australia.

Following a successful trial, it was announced on 1 August 2017 that the Mega Collection would be joined on the stands by 2000 AD: The Ultimate Collection. This new collection would focus on the other stars of the parent title but still include a few Judge Dredd books. None of these, however, would be duplicates of those already included in the Mega Collection.

List of books

"Issue" refers to the order of publication, and "Volume" refers to the order in which the books are intended to be kept once the 90-volume collection is complete.

References

References

Partworks
2015 comics debuts
Comic book collection books
2000 AD comic strips